Christine ("Chris") DeBow (born October 19, 1976 in Media, Pennsylvania) is a former field hockey defender from the United States, who earned a total number of 53 caps for the Women's National Team. The former student of the University of Maryland, where she played for the Terrapins, earned the bronze medal at the 1997 Junior Pan American Championships. She is now currently coaching and is co owner and founder of the field hockey club the eliminators, which is a club based in southern maryland.

International Senior Tournaments
 1997 – Champions Trophy, Berlin, Germany (6th)
 1998 – World Cup, Utrecht, The Netherlands (8th)
 1999 – Pan American Games, Winnipeg, Canada (2nd)
 2000 – Olympic Qualifying Tournament, Milton Keynes, England (6th)

References
 Profile on US Field Hockey

1976 births
Living people
American female field hockey players
Maryland Terrapins field hockey players
People from Media, Pennsylvania
Pan American Games silver medalists for the United States
Pan American Games medalists in field hockey
Field hockey players at the 1999 Pan American Games
Medalists at the 1999 Pan American Games